The 2005–06 season was the 99th season in the existence of Atalanta B.C. and the club's first season back in the second division of Italian football. In addition to the domestic league, Atalanta participated in this season's edition of the Coppa Italia.

Players

First-team squad

Transfers

Pre-season and friendlies

Competitions

Overall record

Serie B

League table

Results summary

Results by round

Matches

Coppa Italia

References

Atalanta B.C. seasons
Atalanta